Diebitsch is a surname. Notable people with the surname include:
Hans Karl von Diebitsch (1785–1831), German serving as Russian field marshal
Karl Diebitsch (1899–1985), German artist and soldier responsible for much of the Third Reich SS regalia
Josephine Cecilia Diebitsch (1863–1955), American arctic explorer with her husband Robert Peary